is a song recorded by South Korean band Day6. The song was released as the group's first Japanese CD single on March 14, 2018, by Warner Music Japan. Ahead of its release, the song was pre-released as a digital single on February 26, 2018. "If -Mata Aetara-" serves as the theme song for the Japanese television drama, Repeat (Unmei wo Kaeru 10 Kagetsu).

Composition
The song is in the key of E Major and is 184 beats per minute.

Track listing

Charts

Daily charts

Weekly charts

Certification and sales

|-
! scope="row"| Japan (RIAJ)
| 
| 4,832 
|-
|}

Release history

References

External links
Day6 Official Japanese Website

2018 singles
2018 songs
J-pop songs
Japanese-language songs
Warner Music Japan singles